Kovači is an urban settlement situated in the city of Kraljevo in Serbia. Its population is 1,255, according to the 22011 Census in Serbia.

Demography 
This village is mostly inhabited by Serbs according to the 2002 Census in Serbia. There is also 1 Macedonian and 1 Ukrainian living in Kovači.

There are 1,031 adult residents living in Kovači, and the average age of the population is 37.9 years. There are 402 households in the settlement, and the average number of members per household is 3.23.

Streets 
The main street connecting Kovači to the main part of Kraljevo is Žička ulica (ulica - street). Other streets in Kovači are Starine Novaka, Pohorska, Kosančićeva, Sinjska, Goraždanska, Petrovaradinska, Braće Jugović, Petra Lekovića, Mataruška, Nevesinjska and Matije Gupca.

Families and their Slavas 
Families with their respectful Slavas are: Aksići (Sveti Nikola), Andrići (?), Bakići (Sveti Luka), Bojkovići (?) Boživići, Dobrosavljevići, Ek (Sveti Jovan), Gajići (Sveti Jovan), Garići (?), Jokići (Lazareva Subota), Lazovići (Sveti Nikola), Lukići (?) Mihajlovići (Sveti Nikola), Milojevići (?), Mulinovi (Sveti Jovan), Perići (Sveti Vrači), Radići (Sveti Stefan), Radosavljevići (?), Raičevići (?), Rajkovići (?), Spasići (Sveti NIkola), Spasojevići (Sveti Luka), Zečevići (?), Žarkovići (?).

References

Populated places in Raška District